The 2021 Florida State Seminoles football team represented Florida State University during the 2021 NCAA Division I FBS football season. The Seminoles played their home games at Doak Campbell Stadium in Tallahassee, Florida, and competed as members of the Atlantic Coast Conference. They were led by head coach Mike Norvell, in his second season.

Schedule

Source:

Game summaries

vs Notre Dame

vs Jacksonville State

at Wake Forest

vs Louisville

vs Syracuse

at North Carolina

vs UMass

at Clemson

vs NC State

vs Miami (FL)

at Boston College

at Florida

Rankings

Coaching staff

Honors

Players drafted into the NFL

References

Florida State
Florida State Seminoles football seasons
Florida State Seminoles football